McCrory is a city in Woodruff County, Arkansas, United States. The population was 1,729 at the 2010 census.

The McCrory Commercial Historic District, the McCrory Waterworks, and the Dr. John William Morris Clinic are all listed on the National Register of Historic Places listings in Woodruff County, Arkansas.

Geography
McCrory is located at  (35.257914, -91.196738).

Demographics

2020 census

As of the 2020 United States Census, there were 1,583 people, 741 households, and 500 families residing in the city.

Education 
McCrory provides public education from the McCrory School District including the McCrory High School.

References

External links
City website

Cities in Arkansas
Cities in Woodruff County, Arkansas